This article lists the squads for the 2003 Women's Rugby League World Cup.

The lists are primarily composed from two sources. The Lion Foundation Woman's Rugby League World Cup 2003 programme, published to coincide with the start of the tournament, lists players' names, their playing positions and club. The New Zealand Rugby League Almanack 2003 listed the scorers for all 25 matches in the tournament.

Australia
Australia played five matches in the tournament: New Zealand Māori, Niue, New Zealand, Samoa and New Zealand Māori (Semi-Final). This list includes the players named in the programme and affirmed as try scorers in the New Zealand Rugby League Almanack plus those named as making their debut in 2003.

Coaching and support staff:
 Coach: Dave Leat
 Assistant Coach: Graham Christie
 Manager: Jeanette Luker
 Trainer: Jacob Christie

Cook Islands
The Cook Islands played six matches: New Zealand, Tokelau, Great Britain, New Zealand Māori, Tokelau and Samoa. The first match, against New Zealand, was their international debut. Players in the Cook Islands team were selected from New Zealand clubs.

Coaching and support staff:
 Coach: Tom Bishop
 Assistant Coach: Karlvon (Kas) Vasau
 Manager: Rita Ngaiti
 Trainer: Joe Hewitt

Great Britain
Great Britain played five matches: Samoa. Tonga, New Zealand Māori, Cook Islands and New Zealand (semi-final).

Notes:
 There are two sources that provide different scorers for the Great Britain versus Tonga game. 
 The match report in the League Express has Nicola Simpson scoring three tries, and Dannielle Titterington not scoring a try.
 The New Zealand Rugby League Almanack has Nicola Simpson scoring two tries, and Dannielle Titterington scoring one try.
 The above table reflects the League Express account.
 the two sources agree on the remaining scorers in the Tonga match, as well as on the scorers for Great Britain in their match against the New Zealand Māori 

 Great Britain Team Support Staff were: Jackie Sheldon (head coach), Michaela Hirst (assistant coach), Andy MacDonald (team manager), Doreen Metcalf (Tour Manager), Joanna Bates (doctor), and Elaine Kirton (physiotherapist). 
 Samantha Bailey, Samantha Brook, Stacey Greenwood, Renee Gregoire and Natalie Parsons were all representatives from the Bradford Thunderbirds club. 
 Andrea Dobson and Sarah Dixon were representatives of the Pendle Panthers club.
 Nicola Benstead was a representative from the Hull Dockers club.
 Bev Langan and Nicola Parry were representatives of the York Acorn Ladies club.
 Aimee Bradshaw and Wendy Charnley were representatives of the Bank Quay Broncos club.

New Zealand
New Zealand played six matches: Cook Islands, Tokelau, Australia, Samoa, Great Britain (semi-final) and New Zealand Māori (final). New Zealand's World Cup squad was named in early June, nearly four months ahead of the tournament, which began on 28 September 2003. The team to play Tokelau appeared in a New Zealand Herald article on the day of the match.

Coaching and support staff:
 Coach: Lawrence Brydon
 Assistant Coach: Stan Martin
 Manager: Juanita Woodhouse
 Trainer: Bob Vercoe
 Physiotherapist: Leah Pearsail
 Assistant trainer/strapper: Hugh McKechnie

New Zealand Māori
New Zealand Māori played six matches: Australia, Niue, Great Britain, Cook Islands, Australia (semi-final) and New Zealand (final).

On 8 August, prior to the World Cup which began in late September 2003, a Test Match between Australia and New Zealand Māori was played at Suncorp Stadium in Brisbane. The teams were listed in the Big League programme. Players in the Māori team were named as follows: Natasha Tehiko, Mere Miki, Annie Brown, Awaroa Waikai, Rachael Wikepa (Wikeepa), Puawai Hohepa, Kelly Kiwi, Vicki Letele, Tania Martin, Karla Clay (Klay), Jodi Piutau (Puitau), Sharyle Winikeri, Tirina Whakatihi; Cecily Stainton, Susan Wilkinson, Faith Dickson, Ani Ngala, Leanne Gardner, Amy Turner with Greg Brown as coach. Names in parenthesis reflect the spelling used in the New Zealand Rugby League Almanac.

Coaching and support staff:
 Coach: Greg Brown
 Assistant Coach: Len Reid
 Manager: Angela Hodge
 Trainers: Kara Hodge, Mark Edmonds
 Physiotherapist: Naumai Tuta
 Statistician: Janie Thompson

Niue
Niue played five matches: New Zealand Māori, Australia, Tokelau, Tonga and Samoa. The first match, against New Zealand Māori, was their international debut.

Coaching and support staff:
 Coach: Meke Lokeni
 Manager: Grace Kapinua
 Strapper: Tomsai Nuku
Note:
 D Broomfield and S Fanokehe were named as scorers for Niue in the Almanack but were not listed in the Programme.

Samoa
Samoa played six matches: Great Britain, Tonga, New Zealand, Australia, Niue and Cook Islands. The first match, against Great Britain, was their international debut.

Coaching and support staff:
 Coach: George Apelii Tuimaseve
 Assistant Coach: Sefo Fuimaono
 Managers: Mary Malloy, Leie Sipel-Schaumkei
 Trainers: Jason McCarthy, Feleti Lefao

Tokelau
Tokelau played six matches: Cook Islands, New Zealand, Tonga, Niue, Cook Islands and Tonga. The first match, against Cook Islands, was their international debut.

Coaching and support staff:
 Coach: Tony Lajpold
 Assistant Coach: John Misley
 Manager: Mat So'otaga
 Physiotherapist: Matt Willett
Note
 J Lenusio was named as a scorer in the Almanack but was not listed – at least with the same spelling – in the Programme.

Tonga
Tonga played five matches: Samoa, Great Britain, Tokelau, Niue and Tokelau. The first match, against Samoa, was their international debut.

The Programme did not list Tonga's coaching and support staff.

References

Rugby League World Cups hosted by New Zealand
Women's World Cup
Women's Rugby League World Cup
2003 in New Zealand rugby league
World Cup